The Greek Food Festival is a festival held in mid-October in Tallahassee, Florida, United States and hosted by the Holy Mother of God Greek Orthodox Church.

Goal 

As in many Greek festivals in the U.S., this festival is part of Tallahassee's diversity of cultures. The goal is to give the community a taste of Greek food, Greek music, Greek culture, Greek dancing, and entertainment. At Greek Festivals you will typically find Greek gourmet food, Greek folk music - usually performed by Greek bands, cultural exhibitions including artifacts from Greece and dances performed in costumes of old tradition, and dancing for the public under Greek tunes. It is a community-building event for the parish.

Foods 
Traditional Greek foods like spanakopita, tzatziki, baklava, dolmades, tsoureki, kothropita, skordalia, melitzanosalata, melomakarona, kakavia soup, kapamas, and kourabiedes are made.

See also 

Greek Food Festival of Dallas

External links 
Greek Food Festival
Tallahassee Food & Dining Index

Food and drink festivals in the United States
Festivals in Florida
Culture of Tallahassee, Florida
Tourist attractions in Tallahassee, Florida
Greek-American culture in Florida
Greek festivals